The 1992 Cairo earthquake, also known as the Dahshur earthquake, occurred at 15:09 local time (13:09 UTC) on 12 October, with an epicenter in the Western Desert near Dahshur, Giza,  south of Egypt's capital and most populous city, Cairo. The earthquake had a magnitude of either 5.8 or 5.9, but was unusually destructive for its size, causing 561 deaths and injuring 12,392 people. It also made over 30,000 families homeless in tens of cities and villages across 16 governorates, in Greater Cairo, the Delta, and northern Upper Egypt. It was the most damaging seismic event to affect Egypt since 1847.

Geology
Cairo is sited within a diffuse zone of faulting that transfers extension from the Gulf of Suez Rift to the Manzala rift beneath the Nile delta.

Damage
The areas of greatest damage were in Old Cairo, Bulaq and southwards along the Nile as far as Girza, on the west bank. 350 buildings were completely destroyed and 9,000 other severely damaged. 216 mosques and 350 schools were badly damaged and about 50,000 people made homeless. Most of the severe damage was confined to older masonry structures and particularly those built of adobe. Liquefaction was reported from areas near the epicenter. It caused the collapse of a multi-storey apartment building in Heliopolis, killing 79 people. Fortunately, many of the inhabitants were outside of the building at the time of the event. It was later revealed that many additional stories were added to the building illegally and the ground floor/basement had been opened up to accommodate community amenities, including a laundry.

The high number of deaths and injuries (561 and 12,392 respectively) was partly due to the amount of panic caused by the earthquake in Cairo itself. Damage was reported to have affected 212 out of a total of 560 historic monuments in the Cairo area. A large block fell from the Great Pyramid of Giza.

Earthquake characteristics

The earthquake was felt throughout most of northern Egypt, in Alexandria, Port Said and as far south as Asyut, and in southern Israel. The calculated focal mechanism suggests that this event originated on a WNW-ESE or W-E trending normal fault with a small strike-slip component. The estimated fault rupture length was also .

Response
The government was criticized for not doing much to respond. On the other hand, Islamic fundamentalist groups such as the Muslim Brotherhood stepped in to provide aid.

See also

List of earthquakes in 1992
List of earthquakes in Egypt
List of earthquakes in the Levant

References

External links

Earthquakes in Egypt
Cairo Earthquake, 1992
Cairo earthquake
October 1992 events in Africa